Galv is a village in Jushin Rural District, Kharvana District, Varzaqan County, East Azerbaijan Province, Iran. At the 2006 census, its population was 380, in 76 families.

References 

Towns and villages in Varzaqan County